Jean-François Bergeron is a Canadian film editor, most noted as a winner of the Jutra Award for Best Editing at the 9th Jutra Awards in 2007 for his work on Bon Cop, Bad Cop. He has also been nominated in the same category four other times, and is a five-time Genie Award nominee for Best Editing.

Recognition

Genie and Canadian Screen Awards
20th Genie Awards (1999): Alegría (nominated with Yves Langois)
25th Genie Awards (2004): The Last Tunnel (Le Dernier tunnel)
27th Genie Awards (2006): Bon Cop, Bad Cop
28th Genie Awards (2007): The 3 L'il Pigs (Les 3 p'tits cochons)
32nd Genie Awards (2011): The Year Dolly Parton Was My Mom

Prix Jutra/Iris
5th Jutra Awards (2003): The Mysterious Miss C. (La Mystérieuse mademoiselle C.)
7th Jutra Awards (2005): The Last Tunnel (Le Dernier tunnel)
9th Jutra Awards (2007): Bon Cop, Bad Cop – won
14th Jutra Awards (2012): A Sense of Humour (Le Sens de l'humour)
19th Quebec Cinema Awards (2017): The 3 L'il Pigs 2 (Les 3 p'tits cochons 2)

Filmography
 2 Mayhem 3 – 1996
 Polygraph (Le polygraphe) – 1996
 Platinum – 1997
 Alegría – 1998
 Agent Provocateur – 1998
 The Secret Adventures of Jules Verne (episode "Rockets of the Dead") – 2000
 Café Olé – 2000
 The List – 2000
 The Pig's Law (La loi du cochon) – 2001
 The Mysterious Miss C. (La mystérieuse mademoiselle C.) – 2002
 Lathe of Heaven – 2002
 Red Nose (Nez rouge) – 2003
 The Last Tunnel (Le dernier tunnel) – 2004
 Battle of the Brave (Nouvelle-France) – 2004
 Bon Cop, Bad Cop – 2006
 The Rip-Off – 2006
 Without Her (Sans elle) – 2006
 Les Boys (3 episodes) – 2008
 Nothing Really Matters – 2008
 Honey, I'm in Love (Le grand départ) – 2008
 Father and Guns (De père en flic) – 2009
 Detour (Détour) – 2009
 The Child Prodigy (L'Enfant prodige) – 2010
 File 13 (Filière 13) – 2010
 Barrymore – 2011
 The Year Dolly Parton Was My Mom – 2011
 A Sense of Humour (Le Sens de l'humour) – 2011
 Guardian Angel (L'Ange gardien) – 2014
 The Far Shore (Dérive) – 2018
 You Will Remember Me (Tu te souviendras de moi) – 2020

References

External links

Canadian film editors
Year of birth missing (living people)
Living people